Marta Gałuszewska (born 23 February 1994 in Elbląg), is a Polish pop singer, known for winning the eighth season of The Voice of Poland on 25 November 2017. She chose to join Michał Szpak team.

In the final episode of the show, Gałuszewska released her debut solo single "Nie mów mi nie". In 2018, she participated in the Polish national final for the Eurovision Song Contest 2018 with English version of her debut single, and she took 5th place.

Singles

As lead artist

As featured artist

Promotional singles

References 

1994 births
Living people
University of Gdańsk alumni
21st-century Polish singers
People from Elbląg
The Voice (franchise) winners